George Abraham Gibbs, 1st Baron Wraxall,  (6 July 1873 – 28 October 1931) was a British Conservative politician.

Early life
Educated at Eton College and Christ Church, Oxford, Gibbs was the eldest of the seven sons of Major Antony Gibbs and Janet Louisa Merivale, daughter of John Louis Merivale. His grandfather, William Gibbs, was the younger brother of George Henry Gibbs, the father of Hucks Gibbs, 1st Baron Aldenham, while his great-grandfather, Antony Gibbs, was the founder of the firm Antony Gibbs & Sons, bankers and merchants.

Military career
Gibbs was appointed a captain in the Yeomanry regiment the North Somerset Yeomanry on 25 September 1895. Following the outbreak of the Second Boer War in late 1899 he volunteered for active service, and on 28 February 1900 was appointed a lieutenant in the Imperial Yeomanry, where he served in the 48th (North Somerset) Company in the 7th Battalion. He was later colonel of the North Somerset Yeomanry, and was appointed deputy lieutenant of Somerset in 1911.

Political career 
In 1906, Gibbs was elected Member of Parliament for Bristol West (succeeding Sir Michael Hicks-Beach), a seat he would hold until 1928. He served as Parliamentary Private Secretary to the Colonial Secretary Walter Long, 1st Viscount Long (his father-in-law), and as a government whip from 1917 to 1921 in the coalition ministry of David Lloyd George. In 1921, he was appointed Treasurer of the Household, a post he continued to hold also under Bonar Law and Baldwin until 1924 and again from 1924 to 1928. Gibbs was sworn of the Privy Council in 1923, and in 1928 he was raised to the peerage as Baron Wraxall, of Clyst St George, in the County of Devon.

Family 
Lord Wraxall married firstly Victoria Florence de Burgh Long, daughter of Walter Long, 1st Viscount Long. They had three children, one daughter and two sons. Both of the sons died as infants. After his first wife's death in 1920, Lord Wraxall married secondly, Hon. Ursula Mary Lawley, daughter of Sir Arthur Lawley (later the 6th Baron Wenlock). They had two sons, successively the 2nd and 3rd Barons Wraxall.

Lord Wraxall died from pneumonia in October 1931, aged 58. He was succeeded in the barony by his eldest son from his second marriage, Richard Gibbs, 2nd Baron Wraxall.

See also
Tyntesfield
Baron Aldenham
Baron Hunsdon of Hunsdon

References

External links 
 
 

1873 births
1931 deaths
People educated at Eton College
Alumni of Christ Church, Oxford
Gibbs, George
Members of the Privy Council of the United Kingdom
Treasurers of the Household
Gibbs, George
Gibbs, George
Gibbs, George
Gibbs, George
Gibbs, George
Gibbs, George
Gibbs, George
UK MPs who were granted peerages
Deputy Lieutenants of Somerset
Deaths from pneumonia in the United Kingdom
Imperial Yeomanry officers
North Somerset Yeomanry officers
George
1
Barons created by George V

ja:ジョージ・ギブズ (初代ラクソール男爵)